Fejér is an administrative county in central Hungary. It lies on the west bank of the river Danube and nearly touches the eastern shore of Lake Balaton. It shares borders with the Hungarian counties Veszprém, Komárom-Esztergom, Pest, Bács-Kiskun, Tolna and Somogy. The capital of Fejér county is Székesfehérvár.

Geography
Geographically, Fejér County is very diverse; its southern part is similar (and adjacent) to the Great Hungarian Plain, and other parts are hilly (Bakony, Vértes, Gerecse mountains). Lake Velence, a popular resort, is also located there.

History

Early history
The area was already inhabited 20,000 years ago. When this part of Hungary formed a Roman province called Pannonia, several settlements stood here: the capital was Gorsium, but there were other significant towns too, where present-day Baracs and Dunaújváros are (the towns were called Annamatia and Intercisa, respectively). In the early Medieval period Huns and Avars lived in the area. After 586 several nomadic people inhabited in the area, until Hungarians conquered it in the late 9th century.

From the Roman conquest until the Ottoman occupation

Hungarians arrived in the area between 895 and 900. The high prince and his tribe settled down in this area. The town of Fehérvár (modern-day Székesfehérvár) became significant as the seat of Prince Géza. Under the reign of his son, King Stephen, the town became the county seat of the newly formed county. Kings of Hungary were crowned and buried in the town until the 16th century.

Fejér under Ottoman rule
Fejér county was occupied by Ottomans between 1543 and 1688. Several of the villages were destroyed, the population dramatically decreased. After being freed from Ottoman rule, local administration was reorganized in 1692. Székesfehérvár got back its town status only in 1703.

Demographics

In 2015, it had a population of 417,651 and the population density was 96/km².

Ethnicity
Besides the Hungarian majority, the main minorities are the Roma (approx. 6,500), Germans (5,500).

Total population (2011 census): 425,847
Ethnic groups (2011 census):
Identified themselves: 372 538 persons:
Hungarians: 356 982 (95,82%)
Roma: 6 277 (1,68%)
Germans: 5 419 (1,45%)
Others and indefinable: 3 860 (1,04%)
Approx. 65,000 persons in Fejér County did not declare their ethnic group at the 2011 census.

Religion

Religious adherence in the county according to 2011 census:

Catholic – 152,234 (Roman Catholic – 150,883; Greek Catholic – 1,292);
Reformed – 46,154; 
Evangelical – 7,143;
Orthodox – 418; 
other religions – 5,524; 
Non-religious – 82,975; 
Atheism – 6,427;
Undeclared – 124,972.

Regional structure

Politics

County Assembly

The Fejér County Council, elected at the 2014 local government elections, is made up of 20 counselors, with the following party composition:

Presidents of the County Assembly

Members of the National Assembly
The following members elected of the National Assembly during the 2022 parliamentary election:

Municipalities 
Fejér County has 2 urban counties, 15 towns, 11 large villages and 78 villages.

Cities with county rights
(ordered by population, as of 2011 census)
Székesfehérvár (100,570)
Dunaújváros (48,484)

Towns

Mór (14,272)
Sárbogárd (12,446)
Bicske (11,891)
Gárdony (9,666)
Ercsi (8,289)
Enying (6,835)
Polgárdi (6,802)
Pusztaszabolcs (6,099)
Martonvásár (5,732)
Velence (5,474)
Csákvár (5,218)
Aba (4,426)
Rácalmás (4,419)
Bodajk (4,219)
Adony (3,717)

Villages

Alap
Alcsútdoboz
Alsószentiván
Bakonycsernye
Bakonykúti
Balinka
Baracs
Baracska
Beloiannisz
Besnyő
Bodmér
Cece 
Csabdi
Csákberény
Csókakő
Csősz
Csór
Daruszentmiklós
Dég
Előszállás 
Etyek 
Fehérvárcsurgó
Felcsút
Füle
Gánt
Gyúró
Hantos
Igar
Iszkaszentgyörgy
Isztimér
Iváncsa
Jenő
Kajászó
Káloz
Kápolnásnyék
Kincsesbánya
Kisapostag
Kisláng
Kőszárhegy
Kulcs
Lajoskomárom 
Lepsény 
Lovasberény
Magyaralmás
Mány
Mátyásdomb
Mezőfalva 
Mezőkomárom
Mezőszentgyörgy
Mezőszilas
Moha
Nadap
Nádasdladány
Nagykarácsony
Nagylók
Nagyveleg
Nagyvenyim
Óbarok
Pákozd
Pátka
Pázmánd
Perkáta 
Pusztavám
Ráckeresztúr
Sáregres
Sárkeresztes
Sárkeresztúr
Sárkeszi
Sárosd 
Sárszentágota
Sárszentmihály
Seregélyes 
Soponya 
Söréd
Sóskút
Sukoró
Szabadbattyán 
Szabadegyháza
Szabadhídvég
Szár
Tabajd
Tác
Tordas
Újbarok
Úrhida
Vajta
Vál
Vereb
Vértesacsa
Vértesboglár
Zámoly
Zichyújfalu

 municipalities are large villages.

Gallery

References

External links
 Official site in Hungarian
 Fehér Megyei Hírlap (feol.hu) - The county portal
Hungary at GeoHive

 
Counties of Hungary